The Golden Point Football Club was an Australian rules football club which competed in the Ballarat Football League from 1905 to 2000. Golden Point was based in the Ballarat suburb of the same name.

They merged with East Ballarat in 2001 to form the East Point Football Club.

Notable players
 Mark Rasmussen
 Charlie Clymo
 Jack Collins
 Geoff Cunningham
 Bob Davis
 Bill Hearn

References

Sport in Ballarat
Ballarat Football League clubs
1880s establishments in Australia
2001 disestablishments in Australia